Dame Wendy Hall  (born 25 October 1952) is a British computer scientist. She is Regius Professor of Computer Science at the University of Southampton.

Early life and education
Wendy Hall was born in west London and educated at Ealing Grammar School for Girls. She studied for undergraduate and postgraduate degrees in mathematics at the University of Southampton. She completed her Bachelor of Science (BSc) degree in 1974, and her Doctor of Philosophy (PhD) degree in 1977. Her doctoral thesis was titled Automorphisms and coverings of Klein surfaces. She later completed a Master of Science degree in Computing at City University London.

Career
Hall returned to the University of Southampton in 1984 to join the newly formed computer science group there, working in multimedia and hypermedia. Her team invented the Microcosm hypermedia system (before the World Wide Web existed), which was commercialised as a start-up company, Multicosm Ltd.

Hall was appointed the University's first female professor of engineering in 1994. She then served as Head of the School of Electronics and Computer Science from 2002–07.

In 2006, along with Tim Berners-Lee, Nigel Shadbolt and Daniel Weitzner, Hall became a founding director of the Web Science Research Initiative (WSRI). Now known as the Web Science Trust, the WSRI was originally a collaboration between the University of Southampton (ECS) and MIT (CSAIL) which aimed to coordinate and support the study of the World Wide Web. The WSRI's activities helped to formally establish the concept of Web Science, and Hall is now Executive Director of the Web Science Trust.

Hall was President of the British Computer Society from 2003-04 and of the Association for Computing Machinery from 2008-10. Since 2014, she has served as a Commissioner for the Global Commission on Internet Governance.

In 2017, Hall was appointed Regius Professor of Computer Science at the University of Southampton.

In 2020 Hall was appointed as Chair of the Ada Lovelace Institute by the Nuffield Foundation – the organisation's independent funder, succeeding Alan Wilson.

Since 2022, Dame Wendy has been the Editor-in-Chief of Royal Society Open Science and served as the Chair of the Royal Society Publishing Board from 2017 to 2022.

Awards and honours
Hall was appointed Commander of the Order of the British Empire (CBE) in the 2000 Birthday Honours. She was promoted to Dame Commander of the Order of the British Empire (DBE) in the 2009 New Year Honours.

Hall also has honorary degrees from Oxford Brookes University, Glamorgan University, Cardiff University, and the University of Pretoria.

In 2000, she was elected a Fellow of the Royal Academy of Engineering (FREng). She is a Fellow of the British Computer Society (FBCS) (also serving as President) and a Fellow of the Institution of Engineering and Technology (FIET). In 2002, she was appointed a Fellow of the City and Guilds (FCGI). Hall was elected a Fellow of the Royal Society (FRS) in 2009.

Her nomination for the Royal Society reads:

In 2006, she was the winner of the ABIE Award for Technical Leadership from the Anita Borg Institute.

In 2010, she was named a Fellow of the ACM "for contributions to the semantic web and web science and for service to ACM and the international computing community." In 2016, she was named a Kluge Chair in Technology and society at the Library of Congress. She is a member of the Advisory Council for the Campaign for Science and Engineering, and a member of the Academia Europaea.

She was one of the 30 women identified in the BCS Women in IT Campaign in 2014 and was featured in the e-book of these 30 women in IT,  "Women in IT: Inspiring the next generation" produced by the BCS, The Chartered Institute for IT, as a free download e-book, from various sources.

In February 2013, she was assessed as one of the 100 most powerful women in the United Kingdom by Woman's Hour on BBC Radio 4. In her Desert Island Discs in 2014, on the same radio channel, she chose Wikipedia as the book she would most like if abandoned on a desert island. She won the Suffrage Science award in 2016.

Publications
In addition to over 500 peer-reviewed journal articles, Dame Wendy co-authored Four Internets with Kieron O'Hara and Vint Cerf in 2021.

Personal life
Dame Wendy Hall is married to Dr Peter Chandler, a plasma physicist.

References

Further reading 

 Wendy Hall's publications (archive)

1952 births
Dames Commander of the Order of the British Empire
English computer scientists
British women computer scientists
Academics of the University of Southampton
Alumni of the University of Southampton
Fellows of the British Computer Society
Fellows of the Institution of Engineering and Technology
Fellows of the Royal Academy of Engineering
Female Fellows of the Royal Academy of Engineering
Living people
People educated at Ealing County Grammar School for Girls
Mathematicians from London
Presidents of the British Computer Society
Female Fellows of the Royal Society
Presidents of the Association for Computing Machinery
Fellows of the Association for Computing Machinery
Members of Academia Europaea
Semantic Web people
21st-century women engineers
People in digital humanities